The state auditor of Minnesota is a constitutional officer in the executive branch of the U.S. state of Minnesota. Nineteen individuals have held the office of state auditor since statehood. The incumbent is Julie Blaha, a DFLer.

Election and term of office
The state auditor is elected by the people on Election Day in November, and takes office on the first Monday of the next January. There is no limit to the number of terms a state auditor may hold. To be elected state auditor, a person must be qualified voter, permanently resident in the state of Minnesota at least 30 days prior to the election, and at least 21 years of age.

In the event of a vacancy in the office of the state auditor, the governor may appoint a successor to serve the balance of the term. The state auditor may also be recalled by the voters or removed from office through an impeachment trial.

Powers and duties
In Minnesota, the state auditor is charged with supervising and auditing the finances of the state's approximately 4,800 local governments, which altogether tax and spend over $40 billion annually. Likewise, the state auditor performs under contract the annual single audit of nearly $26 billion in federal funds spent by state agencies and their subrecipients. The state auditor's authority transcends jurisdictions and applies to all local governments, be they counties, cities, towns, school districts, local pension funds, metropolitan and regional agencies, or myriad special purpose districts, and to every state agency that receives federal financial assistance. In keeping with this position of trust, the state auditor renders opinions on governments' financial statements, examines compliance over financial management with internal controls, conducts best practices reviews of locally-delivered public services, reviews documents, data, and reports filed with the Office of the State Auditor, and investigates complaints of waste, fraud, or abuse of public funds and resources. In addition, the state auditor prescribes uniform systems of accounting and budgeting applicable to all local governments and trains local government officials and employees on matters of public administration and good financial management. The state auditor also collects financial data from local governments, monitors their fiscal health, and issues statutory reports which inform the budgetary and fiscal policies of the governor and Legislature.

Aside from his or her functional responsibilities, the state auditor is by virtue of office a member of the Board of Trustees of the Public Employees Retirement Association, the Executive Council, the Housing Finance Agency Board, the Land Exchange Board, the Records Disposition Panel, the Rural Finance Authority Board, and the State Board of Investment. These bodies steward public pensions, direct the management and disposition of public lands, coordinate emergency management, regulate public records across state and local government, provide financing for housing and rural economic development, and oversee the investment of all state funds - including Minnesota's college and ABLE savings plans, the Permanent School Fund, and the state's three public-sector retirement funds.

History
The state auditor's office has its origins in the Minnesota Territory, when the territorial governor appointed an auditor to ensure that both territorial and county finances were in good order and handled properly. This function continued with an elected state auditor upon Minnesota's entry into the Union on May 11, 1858, and lasted until a 1973 reorganization of state government. During the intervening years, the state auditor acted as the comptroller for the whole of state government. In that capacity, the state auditor maintained the statewide accounting system, preaudited state agency vouchers and claims against the state, approved the disbursement of public funds out of the state treasury, and monitored county finances. Following reorganization, the responsibilities of the state auditor's office were transferred to a state agency known today as the Department of Management and Budget. The Office of the State Auditor then shifted to its present role, which was previously handled by the public examiner, a Cabinet official appointed by the governor that audited local governments and state agencies alike. Following elimination of the Department of the Public Examiner, the elected state auditor took on the duty of supervising and auditing local government finances. At the same time, audits and evaluations of state agency financial management and performance were reassigned to a newly created office of legislative auditor, which is appointed by and reports to the Legislative Audit Commission. Aside from the statewide single audit, which was transferred from the legislative auditor to the state auditor beginning in 2021, this division of auditing responsibility has remained constant since 1973.

Territorial Auditors

State Auditors
The state auditor's term of office was originally three years. In 1883, voters approved a constitutional amendment changing it to four years.

Notes on Minnesota political party names 
Minnesota Democratic-Farmer-Labor Party: On April 15, 1944 the state Democratic Party and the Minnesota Farmer-Labor Party merged and created the Minnesota Democratic-Farmer-Labor Party (DFL). It is affiliated with the national Democratic Party.
Republican Party of Minnesota: From November 15, 1975 to September 23, 1995 the name of the state Republican party was the Independent-Republican party (I-R). The party has always been affiliated with the national Republican Party.

Attempts at higher office
The position of state auditor has become a stepping stone in Minnesota for individuals that hold aspirations of higher office, more so in fact than any other constitutional office. In the past 50 years, two incumbent auditors - Arne Carlson and Mark Dayton - have won competitive gubernatorial races. Conversely, no incumbent or former secretary of state has ever won an election for governor or U.S. senator in that timeframe; the same goes for any incumbent or former attorney general. Likewise, Rudy Perpich and Tina Smith are the only lieutenant governors since 1972 to ever be elected a governor or a U.S. senator.

External links
Office of the State Auditor of Minnesota
Executive Council of Minnesota
Land Exchange Board of Minnesota
Minnesota Housing Finance Agency
Public Employees Retirement Association of Minnesota
Minnesota Records Disposition Panel
Rural Finance Authority of Minnesota
Minnesota State Board of Investment

References

Minnesota